This is a list of known wars, conflicts, battles/sieges, missions and operations involving  former kingdoms and states in the Indian subcontinent and the modern day Republic of India and its predecessors.

Ancient India (c. 15th to 1st century BCE)

Classical India (c. 1st to 6th century CE)

Early Medieval India (c. 7th to 12th century CE)

Late Medieval India (c. 13th to 15th century CE)

Early Modern India (c. 16th to mid 19th century CE)

Modern India (c. 1850s to 1947 CE)

Wars involving British Indian Empire 

Following the Indian Rebellion of 1857, the rule of the British East India company came to end and the British crown began to rule over India directly as per the Government of India Act 1858. India was now a single empire comprising British India and the Princely states.

Wars involving Azad Hind 

Azad Hind (with its Indian National Army) was a provisional government put in place in Japanese-occupied India by Netaji Subhas Chandra Bose with the help of Japan during World War II.

Post-Colonial India (c.  1947–present)

Wars involving Union and Republic of India

In 1947, the British Indian Empire split into the Dominion of Pakistan and the  Union of India. The Indian Army, the Royal Indian Air Force and the Royal Indian Navy too, were divided between the two countries. In 1950, the Union of India became the Republic of India after abolishing monarchy.

See also
 Afghan–Sikh Wars
 List of wars involving the Mughal Empire
 Battles involving the Maratha Empire
 List of battles between Mughals and Sikhs
 List of wars involving Delhi Sultanate
 List of Anglo-Indian Wars
 Rajput resistance to Muslim conquests
 Indian Army United Nations peacekeeping missions

Notes

References

India
 
 
Wars
Wars
Wars